Mittagong railway station is a heritage-listed railway station on the Main South line in New South Wales, Australia. It serves the town of Mittagong in the Southern Highlands. It was added to the New South Wales State Heritage Register on 2 April 1999.

History

The station opened on 1 March 1867. The station is the junction for the old alignment of the Main South Railway line from Picton, and for the now lifted line to the ghost town of Joadja.

The Platform 1 station building was erected in 1873 and the wooden structure on Platform 2 in 1919 when the line was duplicated.

Platforms & services
Mittagong has two side platforms. It is serviced by NSW TrainLink Southern Highlands Line services travelling between Campbelltown and Moss Vale with limited morning services to Sydney Central and limited evening services to Goulburn.

It is also serviced by NSW Trainlink Xplorer long-distance services from Sydney to Canberra and Griffith. This is a request stop for this service (except for Sydney-bound Canberra/Griffith Xplorer on Thursdays and Sundays), so the trains stop only if passengers booked to board/alight here.

Transport links
Berrima Buslines operate four routes via Mittagong station:
806: Bowral to Bargo
811: to Moss Vale
816: to Moss Vale

Berrima Buslines operate one route for NSW Trainlink via Mittagong station:
Loopline Bus: Bowral station to Picton station

Description 

The former station complex consists of two station buildings: a brick second-class station building of type 3 design (1870) on platform 1 and a timber skillion roof building with return canopy of type 7 design (1867 with 1873 and 1915 additions) on platform 2, both with brick-faced platforms. The former refreshment rooms (1873) are also located on Platform 1.

The station has two one remaining signal box: a type 3 timber skillion roof platform level box (1919). A junction signal box was removed pre-2000. The goods shed (1915) is 60' x 40' of through shed sub-type 1 design. A steel and timber pedestrian footbridge (1920) links the platforms.

A 5-ton jib crane (T156) and Avery 10 tonne weighing machine were removed pre-2004.

Heritage listing 
Mittagong is an important early site with significant railway buildings. The location of the station near the centre of the town gives it a civic importance. Of particular interest is the refreshment room which was used only for a short period until replaced by the refreshment room at Moss Vale because the Governor who alighted at Moss Vale for his country residence did not want to be kept waiting at Mittagong while refreshments were taken. The station complex in particular is of high significance with an early railway building (1867) surviving in the group.

Mittagong railway station was listed on the New South Wales State Heritage Register on 2 April 1999.

References

Attribution

External links

Mittagong station details Transport for New South Wales

John Whitton railway stations
Railway stations in Australia opened in 1867
Regional railway stations in New South Wales
Mittagong, New South Wales
Articles incorporating text from the New South Wales State Heritage Register
New South Wales State Heritage Register
Main Southern railway line, New South Wales